Najam ul Hasan (born 15 March 1952), is a Pakistani jurist who served as the 16th Chief Justice of the Federal Shariat Court, in office from 15 May 2017 till 10 May 2019.

Early life and education
Najam ul Hasan's father was a prominent lawyer but unfortunately he died young when Hasan was only 16 years old. He passed his matriculation from Govt. Pilot High School, Lahore, and Intermediate Examinations from Forman Christian College, Lahore. He completed his L.L.B from University of Punjab.

References 

1952 births
Pakistani judges
Living people